Bluegrass & White Snow: A Mountain Christmas is the twelfth album of original recordings by country music artist Patty Loveless. The first half of the album comprises covers of well-known traditional Christmas tunes. There are new renditions of the familiar "Silver Bells" and "Christmas Time's a-Coming."  There are also three new tunes, all co-written by Loveless and her producer-husband Emory Gordy Jr.: "Santa Train," "Christmas Day at My House," and "Bluegrass, White Snow," the latter of which is supported by vocals from Dolly Parton and Ricky Skaggs. There is an instrumental track on the album, "Carol of the Bells." (This would be the only track on a Patty Loveless album on which Loveless herself is absent.) The album rose as high as #20 on the Billboard Top Country albums chart.

Track listing
"Away in a Manger" (Traditional) – 2:50
"Silent Night" (Josef Mohr, Franz Gruber) – 3:14
"Joy to the World" [with Jon Randall] (George Frideric Handel, Isaac Watts, Lowell Mason) – 2:12
"Carol of the Bells" [instrumental] (Mykola Dmytrovych Leontovych, Peter Wilhousky) – 2:36
"The First Noel" (Traditional) – 2:17
"Little Drummer Boy" [with Rebecca Lynn Howard] (Katherine K. Davis, Henry Onorati, Harry Simeone) – 3:54
"Silver Bells" (Jay Livingston, Ray Evans) – 3:21
"O Little Town of Bethlehem" (Phillips Brooks, Lewis H. Redner) – 3:46
"Christmas Time's A-Comin'" (Tex Logan) – 3:36
"Santa Train" (Patty Loveless, Emory Gordy Jr.) – 2:58
"Christmas Day at My House" (Loveless, Gordy Jr.) – 2:25
"Beautiful Star of Bethlehem" (Arthur Leroy Phipps) – 3:22
"Bluegrass, White Snow" (Loveless, Gordy Jr.) – 3:21

Personnel 

 Butch Baldassari – Mandolin
 Todd Cerney – Mandolin
 Jim DeMain – Mastering
 Charlie Derrington – Mandola
 Tonya Derry – Artist Coordination
 Stephan Dudash – Mandolin
 Stuart Duncan – Fiddle, Mandolin, Mandocello
 Gene Ford – Guitar
 Claudia Fowler – Stylist
 Steve Gibson – Banjo, Bouzouki, Guitar, Percussion, Mandola
 Vince Gill – Mandolin, Background Vocals 
 Emory Gordy Jr. – Bass, Guitar, Arranger, Producer
 Amy Grant – Background Vocals 
 Rob Haines – Mandolin
 Russ Harrington – Photography
 Emmylou Harris – Background Vocals 
 Deb Haus – Art Direction, Artist Development
 John Hedgecoth – Mandocello
 Tim Hensley – Mandolin, Background Vocals 
 Jim Horn – Recorder
 Rob Ickes – Dobro
 Beth Kindig – Art Direction, Design
 Lauren Koch – Contractor
 Butch Lee – Dobro, Percussion, Bass Drums, Bells, Wind Chimes, Glass

 Patty Loveless – Lead Vocals, Sleigh Bells, Train Whistle
 Claire Lynch – Background Vocals 
 Van Manakas – Mandolin
 Anthony Martin – A&R
 J.C. Monterrosa – Assistant
 Nashville Mandolin Ensemble – Arranger
 Justin Niebank – Engineer, Mixing
 Alan O'Bryant – Banjo
 Dolly Parton – Background Vocals 
 Carmella Ramsey – Fiddle, Background Vocals 
 Jon Randall – Mandolin, Background Vocals 
 Deanie Richardson – Fiddle, Mandolin
 Victoria Russell – Creative Producer
 Ricky Skaggs – Mandolin, Background Vocals 
 Kay Smith – Artist Coordination
 David Spicher – Bass
 Bruce Sweetman – Mandolin
 Biff Watson – Guitar, Hi String Guitar, Baritone Guitar
 Blake Williams – Banjo, Bass
 Debra Wingo – Make-Up, Hair Stylist
 Trisha Yearwood – Background Vocals 
 Paul Zonn – Arranger

Chart performance

References

External links
Bluegrass, White Snow performance at YouTube.
 Beautiful Star Of Bethlehem performance at YouTube

Epic Records albums
Patty Loveless albums
Albums produced by Emory Gordy Jr.
2002 Christmas albums
Christmas albums by American artists
Country Christmas albums